Drosophila testacea is a member of the testacea species group of Drosophila. Testacea species are specialist fruit flies that breed on the fruiting bodies of mushrooms. Drosophila testacea can be found in temperate regions of Europe, extending to east Asia. Drosophila testacea and Drosophila orientacea can produce viable hybrids, though they are separated by geography and behavioural barriers. Drosophila testacea females will also readily mate with Drosophila neotestacea males, but viable hybrids are never produced. This hybrid inviability (see Haldane's rule)) may be due to selfish X chromosomes and co-evolved suppressors. Alternately, differences in sex pheromone (e.g. vaccenyl acetate) reception could underlie female readiness and male willingness to copulate.

The antimicrobial peptide gene Diptericin B has been pseudogenized in D. testacea and likely its sister species D. neotestacea.

See also 

 Drosophila testacea species group
 Meiotic drive
 Haldane's rule

References 

testacea
Insects described in 1992